Sigma Towers  is a proposed building project situated in Cluj-Napoca, Romania,  which would comprise two 35 floor towers linked by a 4 floor commercial centre, another two buildings of 7 and 5 floors and a 3 floor parking building.

The first tower T1
T1 will be a 49,000 m2 building with:
15,500 m2 of office spaces;
11,500 m2 five star hotel with 170 rooms;
22,000 m2 of apartments.

The second tower T2
T2 will be a 71,000 m2 building with:
44,000 m2 of office spaces;
12,000 m2 shopping spaces;
15,000 m2 of apartments.

The entire complex would have a total of 1,350 parking spaces in a 3 floor separate building.

External links
 Reference

Skyscrapers in Romania
Proposed buildings and structures in Romania
Twin towers
Proposed skyscrapers